MumboJumbo, LLC was an independent developer of games for personal computers, game consoles and mobile devices. MumboJumbo Mobile, LLC publishes entertainment software for Android and iOS devices.

History
The company was founded in January 2001 by Mark Dochtermann and Ron Dimant after leaving Ritual Entertainment. In 2003 it became one of the first independent developers to popularize casual games by partnering with portal sites to make games available for download directly to Windows and Mac computers.

MumboJumbo was previously a United Developers Company that acquired other development companies including Zono, Ritual Entertainment, and Hot Lava Studios.

On January 24, 2007, MumboJumbo announced their acquisition of Ritual Entertainment, a popular developer of first person shooter titles such as SiN and Star Trek: Elite Force II. Upon acquisition Ritual was made to assist with work on casual game titles, causing many prominent employees to leave the company and many analysts to speculate why the acquisition had been made in the first place. Some analysts have since criticized the move as both foolish and a massive waste of money. It is still unclear as to the purpose of MumboJumbo's decision, as MumboJumbo has still not released an official statement regarding their intentions to acquire a game developer known for creating mature titles in order to re-purpose them for casual game development.

On January 25, 2010, a jury in the 193rd Civil District Court in Dallas County, Texas awarded MumboJumbo $4,600,000 in damages resulting from a breach of contract on the part of their former business partner PopCap Games. MumboJumbo had previously held a North American retail distribution agreement with the casual games developer. According to MumboJumbo, the relationship was violated when PopCap Games began to develop its own strategies for selling at retail. During the 12-day trial, MumboJumbo's law firm Rose-Walker showed that PopCap's actions "severely damaged" their business relationship with Wal-Mart.

As of January 2022, their website is owned and hosted by a cybersquatting firm.  While some of their games have been broken by MacOS Monterey, they are still available for purchase from Apple.

Games developed
Myth III: The Wolf Age (2001)Baldur's Gate II: Shadows of Amn (2001, Mac port)Luxor series: Luxor (2005); Luxor Amun Rising (2005); Luxor Mahjong (2006); Luxor 2 (2006); Luxor 3 (2007); Luxor: Quest for the Afterlife (2008); Luxor Adventures (2009)  Luxor 5th Passage (2010); Luxor HD (2011); Luxor Amun Rising HD (2012); Luxor Evolved (2012); Luxor 2 HD (2013)Angelica Weaver: Catch Me When You Can: Be the detective; Catch the killer in the present and the pastMidnight Mysteries Series: The Edgar Allan Poe Conspiracy, Salem Witch Trials, Devil on the Mississippi, Haunted Houdini, Witches of Abraham, GhostwritingSamantha Swift series: The Hidden Roses of Athena, The Golden Touch, The Fountains of Fate, The Mystery from AtlantisChainz series: Chainz, Chainz 2 Relinked, Chainz GalaxyPickers: Pick • Sell • Trade • Haggle • AppraiseGlowfish: A Magical Underwater AdventureUnlikely SuspectsDiscovery: A Seek and Find AdventureZombie Bowl-O-RamaThe OfficeElementsTornado JockeySquare Logic: Everyday GeniusLittle FarmZoomBookJohnny Bravo in The Hukka-Mega-Mighty-Ultra-Extreme Date-O-RamaGames not developed but publishedMargrave series (Point-and-click adventure games). Developed by Inertia.Farm Frenzy (Developed by Alawar Entertainment, 2007)Reaxxion7 Wonders series: 7 Wonders, 7 Wonders 2, 7 Wonders: Treasures of Seven, 7 Wonders: Magical Mystery Tour, 7 Wonders: Ancient Alien Makeover''

References

External links
MumboJumbo Website

Companies based in Dallas
American companies established in 2001
Video game companies established in 2001
Video game companies based in Texas
Video game development companies
2001 establishments in Texas